Lasserre is the name of several communes in France:

Places
 Lasserre, Ariège, in the Ariège department
 Lasserre, Haute-Garonne, in the Haute-Garonne department
 Lasserre, Lot-et-Garonne, in the Lot-et-Garonne department
 Lasserre, Pyrénées-Atlantiques, in the Pyrénées-Atlantiques department

People
 Augusto Lasserre (1826–1906), an Argentinian naval officer
 Pierre Lasserre (1867–1930), a French literary critic, journalist and essayist
 René Lasserre (1895–1965), a French rugby union player

Ships
 ARA Augusto Lessarre (Q-9), a survey ship which served in the Argentine Navy from 1963 to 1969, previously the British Royal Navy frigate 

Establishments
 Lasserre, a restaurant in Paris